The Serbian Futsal Cup is an annual cup competition for Serbian futsal teams. It is organized by the Football Association of Serbia and was founded in the 2005–06 season.

Finals

Winners by titles

Related competitions
 Prva Futsal Liga

External links 
 futsalplanet.com

Futsal competitions in Serbia
Serbia
Futsal in Serbia